In Greek mythology, the name Iphianeira may refer to two women, great-grandmother and great-granddaughter:

Iphianeira, daughter of Megapenthes and wife of Melampus, mother of Antiphates, Abas, Pronoe and Manto.
Iphianeira, granddaughter of the precedent's son Antiphates and Zeuxippe, daughter of Oicles and Hypermnestra, sister of Amphiaraus and Polyboea.

Notes

References 

 Diodorus Siculus, The Library of History translated by Charles Henry Oldfather. Twelve volumes. Loeb Classical Library. Cambridge, Massachusetts: Harvard University Press; London: William Heinemann, Ltd. 1989. Vol. 3. Books 4.59–8. Online version at Bill Thayer's Web Site
 Diodorus Siculus, Bibliotheca Historica. Vol 1-2. Immanel Bekker. Ludwig Dindorf. Friedrich Vogel. in aedibus B. G. Teubneri. Leipzig. 1888-1890. Greek text available at the Perseus Digital Library.

Women in Greek mythology
Characters in Greek mythology
Mythology of Argos